Berkshire is an unincorporated community in Delaware County, in the U.S. state of Ohio.

History
Berkshire was laid out in 1804. It is the oldest settlement in Berkshire Township, from which it takes its name. A post office called Berkshire was in operation from 1810 until 1902. An early variant name was Berkshire Corners.

Notable person
 Martha Wintermute, author and poet

References

Unincorporated communities in Delaware County, Ohio
Unincorporated communities in Ohio